Anthony Wayne Local School District is a school district in Northwest Ohio. The school district serves students who live in the municipalities of Whitehouse and Waterville, and in Monclova Township; it also serves students in parts of Providence Township and Swanton Township in Lucas County, and Middleton Township in Wood County.
The superintendent is Dr. Jim Fritz.

Grades 9-12
Anthony Wayne High School

Grades 7-8
Anthony Wayne Junior High School

Grades 5-6
Fallen Timbers Middle School

Grades K-4
Monclova Primary
Waterville Primary
Whitehouse Primary

External links
District Website

School districts in Ohio
Education in Lucas County, Ohio